Corsino is a male given name. Notable people with the name include:

People with the given name
Corsino Fernández (1920–2011), Argentine long-distance runner
Corsino Fortes (1933–2015), Cape Verdean writer, poet and diplomat

People with the middle name
Ángel Corsino Fernández (born 1951), Spanish sports shooter

Portuguese masculine given names
Spanish masculine given names